Robert Hibbert (1750–1835) was an English merchant in Kingston, Jamaica. He owned Albion plantation, owned slaves, and was a justice of the peace for Kingston, Saint George, and Saint Mary parishes.
 
In 1791, he purchased the original Birtles Hall in Cheshire, demolished it and built a new house, and in 1798 he purchased Pains Hill in Surrey.

References 

1750 births
1835 deaths
Businesspeople from Manchester
Jamaican justices of the peace
English landowners
Planters of Jamaica
British slave owners
English merchants